Huckabee is a TV political commentary program, following the basic format of a late-night talk variety show, on TBN hosted by former Republican Arkansas Governor Mike Huckabee. It premiered on Fox News on September 27, 2008, until January 3, 2015, when Huckabee ended his show to focus on running in the 2016 presidential election. The program returned after the election, this time airing on TBN. The TBN incarnation premiered on October 7, 2017.

Schedule
Barring pre-emption, new episodes of Huckabee regularly air on Saturdays at 8 PM ET. Repeats are shown at 11 PM, and on the following Sunday (the next day) at 9 PM ET. Newsmax TV airs a next-day encore of the show on Sunday afternoons.

Format

Fox News
The show was shot before a live studio audience. Huckabee started with an opening monologue discussing issues of the day, then opened the floor to field several questions from the audience. The show also featured one or more guests as well as a panel of commentators.

Huckabee maintains a genial style as host and speaker, "markedly less combative" than other commentators on the Fox network and Fox News Channel. Tonal differences aside, he believes the show's conservative political content is harmonious with other Fox News hosts past and present such as Glenn Beck, Sean Hannity and Bill O'Reilly, saying "I'm certainly on the same ideological spectrum" as them.
The programs concluded with a "house band" (named The Little Rockers; the name is a play on the Arkansas state capital where Huckabee once served) consisting of several Fox News staff performing a song, often featuring a well-known entertainer as the lead. Band members include host Huckabee on bass guitar, chief religious correspondent Lauren Green on keyboards, M and J Show  video editor Dave Colonna on lead guitar, lighting technician Adrian Sharkey on vocals and guitar, M and J Show writer Bob Higgins on guitar, Fox News Edge PA Elizabeth Tucker on backup vocals, and final cut craft editor Dominic Salvatore on drums.

In some instances, the final segment featured Huckabee answering questions from e-mails or from the live studio audience.

TBN
In 2017, the show made a comeback on TBN. The show is prerecorded before a studio audience at the Huckabee Theater, located in Hendersonville, Tennessee, a few days before it airs. Announcer Keith Bilbrey goes over the lineup of the show at the beginning and throughout the show. The house band, the "Music City Connection", performs instrumentals of various songs throughout the show. Huckabee then starts with an opening monologue discussing the issues of the week. The show features a handful of different guests each week who are invited by Huckabee to talk about their topics of expertise and how one can learn more about them and their work. There are recurring segments of the show as well, such as "In Case You Missed It", which highlights the funny and weird news stories of the week, and "Huck's Heroes", which highlights someone who has done a good deed in their community. The show features a different comedy act each week. Sometimes, Huckabee will set time aside to answer questions sent to him by viewers. The show ends with a different musician each week or if there is no musical guest, the Music City Connection will perform.

See also
 The Huckabee Report 2009 to 2015 radio program

References

External links
 
 

2008 American television series debuts
2017 American television series debuts
2015 American television series endings
2000s American television news shows
2010s American television news shows
2020s American television news shows
2000s American television talk shows
2010s American television talk shows
2020s American television talk shows
2000s American late-night television series
2010s American late-night television series
2020s American late-night television series
2000s American variety television series
2010s American variety television series
2020s American variety television series
Fox News original programming
Trinity Broadcasting Network original programming
Conservative media in the United States
Mike Huckabee